The whip eel (Bascanichthys scuticaris, also known as the sooty eel) is an eel in the family Ophichthidae (worm/snake eels). It was described by George Brown Goode and Tarleton Hoffman Bean in 1880. It is a marine, subtropical eel which is known from the western Atlantic Ocean, including the United States and the Gulf of Mexico. It inhabits reefs and coastal waters.

References

Ophichthidae
Fish described in 1880